"Freedom! '90" (also known simply as "Freedom!") is a song written, produced, and performed by British singer-songwriter George Michael, and released on Columbia Records in October 1990. The "'90" added to the end of the title is to prevent confusion with a hit by Michael's former band Wham!, also entitled "Freedom". The song's backing beat is a sample from James Brown's song "Funky Drummer".

It was the third single taken from Listen Without Prejudice Vol. 1 (1990), though released as the second single from the album in the US and Australia. "Freedom! '90" was one of a few uptempo songs on this album. It was a major hit and peaked at No. 8 on the US Billboard Hot 100. The song refers to Michael's past success with Wham!, yet also shows a new side of himself as a new man, who is more cynical about the music business than he had been before. 

Michael refused to appear in the music video for the song and cast a group of supermodels to appear instead. It went into heavy rotation on MTV and was remastered for the 2017 documentary, George Michael: Freedom. On 30 October 2020 it premiered on YouTube in 4K for its 30th anniversary. Michael performed this song, alongside his 2012 single "White Light", during the closing ceremony of the 2012 London Olympics. In 2021, Rolling Stone placed "Freedom! '90" at number 126 in their list of "500 Best Songs of All Time".

Chart performance
"Freedom! '90" was 6:30 long, but a shorter version was made available for radio consumption. The radio edit was made by removing the upbeat in several portions of the song and cutting straight to the downbeat. The addition of the year to the title was to distinguish the song from "Freedom", a number one hit in the UK for Wham! in 1984 (number 3 in the US in 1985). It was the second US single from the album Listen Without Prejudice Vol. 1, and had contrasting fortunes on each side of the Atlantic—it peaked at number 28 on the UK Singles Chart, but was a major success on the US Billboard Hot 100, reaching number 8 and selling over 500,000 copies to earn a Gold certification from the RIAA. It remained in the Billboard top 40 for 12 weeks in late 1990 and early 1991. In Canada, Michael achieved another chart-topper. As of October 2017, the single sold 83,000 copies in UK.

Critical reception
Stephen Thomas Erlewine from AllMusic named the song a "highlight" from Listen Without Prejudice Vol. 1. Larry Flick from Billboard wrote, "Platinum pop star waxes both cynical and philosophical on this well-worded stab at his early days of fame. Slowly ingratiating, midtempo R&B/hip-hop base could also reaffirm his presence at club level." In an 2008 review, The Daily Vault's Melanie Love stated, "Its catchy chorus and uptempo, jangling instrumentation, coupled with his signature soaring vocals make this confessional a striking example of Michael's newfound independence and proves that his struggle for seriousness could retain the hooks and brilliant tones that make his music so endearing." Adam Sweeting from The Guardian named it one of the "best tracks" of the album, adding, "'Freedom! '90' is a boppy slice of pop which nods in the direction of house and of Happy Mondays' much more scintillating "Step On". Its bright, clanging piano provides the aural focus." Chris Roberts from Melody Maker declared it as "a bleeding-heart apology for his reckless sexy past."	

Pan-European magazine Music & Media remarked that a "stirring Bo Diddley beat, a gospel approach and a great piano riff are the main features of this addictive hit candidate." Victoria Segal from NME noted "the hate-fuelled "Sympathy for the Devil" roll" of the song. A reviewer from People commented, "On "Freedom 90"—at least this one's set to a radio-ready groove—he rails against the image he has spent the last four years cultivating: "I was every little hungry schoolgirl's pride and joy/And I guess it was enough for me/To win the race? A prettier face!/Brand new clothes and a big fat place/On your rock and roll TV/But today the way I play the game is not the same/No way"."

Music video

By 1990, Michael had become weary of the pressures of fame, telling the Los Angeles Times, "At some point in your career, the situation between yourself and the camera reverses. For a certain number of years, you court it and you need it, but ultimately, it needs you more and it's a bit like a relationship. The minute that happens, it turns you off ... and it does feel like it is taking something from you." Accordingly, he decided not to appear in photo shoots and music videos, saying, "I would like to never step in front of a camera again."

Although he later relented and decided to film a video for his new song, he still refused to appear in it. Instead, inspired by Peter Lindbergh's now-iconic portrait of Naomi Campbell, Linda Evangelista, Tatjana Patitz, Christy Turlington, and Cindy Crawford for the January 1990 cover of the British edition of Vogue, Michael asked the five models to appear in the video. While models appearing in music videos was then commonplace, usually such models played the singer's love interest, as with Christie Brinkley's appearance in her future husband Billy Joel's "Uptown Girl" video, or Turlington's appearance in Duran Duran's "Notorious" video. For "Freedom! '90", the five models, rather than portraying his on-screen girlfriends, would lip sync the song in his place. The video also included male models John Pearson, Scott Benoit, Peter Formby, Todo Segalla, and fashion photographer Mario Sorrenti.

Evangelista took some persuading before agreeing to appear in the video, saying, "He thought it would make us into a big deal, that it would be good for us. I was like, 'Please, we're here. We've already arrived!'" After speaking with Michael, she was convinced, and rearranged her schedule. In a 2015 Vanity Fair article, Evangelista reflected on her decision positively, saying, "Little did I know that to this day, when someone meets me for the first time, they bring up that video. That's what they remember. So yeah, George was right." An initial disagreement over their salaries was resolved when Annie Veltri, who represented Crawford, Evangelista, Campbell, and Patitz at Elite Model Management, clarified that all of her clients would be compensated equally, at $15,000 a day.

The video was directed by David Fincher, who had also directed videos by Madonna, Billy Idol, Aerosmith, and Paula Abdul (who choreographed George Michael's Faith Tour). His team for the multi-day "Freedom! '90" shoot included Camilla Nickerson, who later became a Vogue contributing editor, as the clothes stylist, hair stylist Guido and makeup artist Carol Brown. Cinematographer Mike Southon shot the video in a vast building in the London Borough of Merton that Nickerson says exhibited "a grandeur and a Blade Runner feel". Despite not appearing in the video, Michael was on set.

The 92-sketch storyboard called for each model to film on separate days, except for Evangelista and Turlington, who appear in a scene together. Each model was assigned a verse to lip-synch, while for the song's chorus, Fincher envisioned the three iconic items from Michael's 1987 music video "Faith" that had come to symbolize his public image at the time: his leather jacket, a Wurlitzer jukebox, and guitar, exploding in a ball of flame, except the leather jacket, at each occurrence of the word "freedom" during the chorus. Before the chorus, the leather jacket was simply ignited and burned. Whereas "Faith" had opened with a jukebox phonograph needle touching a vinyl record, "Freedom! '90" opens with a compact disc player's laser beam reading a CD, after Evangelista turns on the CD player. In a 2004 interview with Adam Mattera for UK magazine Attitude, Michael reflected on the significance of the video's symbolism: "By the end of the Faith tour I was so miserable because I absolutely knew that I was gay... I didn't suddenly want to come out. I wanted to do it with some kind of dignity. So I thought 'okay, you have to start deconstructing this whole image.'"

Nickerson envisioned a "low-key street style" for the wardrobe, which she characterizes as "a sort of undone beauty", contrasting the prevailing "vampy, larger-than-life" direction in which the fashion industry, typified by models doing film work, was moving at the time. The black sweater worn by Evangelista was from Nickerson's own closet, and the studded biker boots worn by Campbell belonged to Nickerson's boyfriend. Most of the wardrobe budget, however, went to the 60-foot-long linen sheet used by Turlington, the nature of which was specified by Fincher. Guido looked to each model's personality to devise hairdos that would accentuate their "true beauty". Evangelista was up until 3:00am the night before the shoot dyeing her hair platinum blonde, which reflected the cool-blue lights of the set, while Campbell's hair was curled and pulled up with a headband for a 1960s "tough chic" in order to highlight her movement for a shot in which she dances solo. Patitz's hair was framed with soft curls and Turlington's was gelled back to exploit her statuesque form as her character crosses the screen trailing the linen sheet. Brown also tried to highlight each model's personality with makeup, saying, "Cindy was the sexy one; Christy was the cool, classic one; and Linda was the chameleon. She could do anything." Following Fincher's instruction that Crawford's makeup look "completely trashed, as if she'd been in a steamy atmosphere," Brown did Crawford's makeup, and then oiled it down by covering her with glycerin. Crawford spent most of her time topless and sitting in an empty bathtub, resting on an apple box so that enough of her would be visible.

The video premiered a few weeks after the shoot, and was heavily aired on MTV. Reflecting on the video in 2015, Crawford stated that, at the time, they thought they were simply making "a really cool video," but that in retrospect, the video exhibits a dark humor: As MTV had altered the music industry so that physical beauty was now necessary to sell music, the video used five beautiful faces instead of the song's vocalist to mock this.

Impact and legacy
Slant Magazine listed "Freedom! '90" at number 30 in their ranking of "The 100 Best Singles of the 1990s" in 2011.

Time Out ranked it number two in their list of "The 50 Best Gay Songs to Celebrate Pride All Year Long" in 2022.

Formats and track listings
 7-inch and cassette single (UK)
 "Freedom! '90" – 6:29
 "Freedom" (Back to Reality Mix) – 5:01

 CD single (US)
 "Freedom! '90" – 6:29
 "Fantasy" – 5:01

Credits

Musicians 
 George Michael –  lead and backing vocals, keyboard bass, percussion, arrangements, production
 Danny Cummings – percussion
 Phil Palmer – acoustic and electric guitar
 Chris Cameron – keyboards, piano
 Shirley Lewis – backing vocals

Production 

 Chris Porter – mix engineer

Charts and certifications

Weekly charts

Year-end charts

Certifications

Robbie Williams version

English singer-songwriter Robbie Williams covered "Freedom" and released it as his debut solo single in July 1996, a year after his departure from Take That. The song reached number two in the UK, 26 places higher than Michael's original, and was not included on any of his albums until 2010, when it appeared on Williams' greatest hits album In and Out of Consciousness: Greatest Hits 1990–2010. The single was certified Silver by the British Phonographic Industry, denoting shipments of over 200,000. Williams had left Take That the previous year and therefore could identify himself with much of the sentiment in the song, although he did not use the line "we had every bigshot goodtime band on the run boy, we were living in a fantasy" in his version.

Critical reception
Caroline Sullivan from The Guardian rated Williams' version of the song three out of five. A reviewer from Music Week gave it four out of five, adding, "A pretty good return from Williams. His fans should forgive the, at times, dodgy vocals and send him towards the top of the chart with this George Michael cover."

Music video
The accompanying music video shows Williams dancing in the sea and in a field, celebrating his separation from his former group. In a 2010 interview with Magic 105.4, Williams told Neil Fox that the song had not even been recorded by the scheduled date of filming, which required him to mime to Michael's version of the song.

Track listings

 UK CD1
 "Freedom"
 "Freedom" (Arthur Baker Mix)
 "Freedom" (instrumental)
 "Interview" (part one)

 UK CD2
 "Freedom" (radio edit)
 "Freedom" (The Next Big Genn Mix)
 "Freedom" (Arthur Baker's Shake and Bake Mix)
 "Interview" (part two)

 UK cassette single
 "Freedom" (full length version)
 "Freedom" (The Next Big Genn Mix)
 "Freedom" (Arthur Baker's Shake and Bake Mix)

 European CD single
 "Freedom" (radio edit)
 "Freedom" (The Next Big Genn Mix)

Charts

Weekly charts

Year-end charts

Certifications

References

1990 singles
1990 songs
1996 debut singles
Chrysalis Records singles
Columbia Records singles
George Michael songs
Music videos directed by David Fincher
Number-one singles in Scotland
Number-one singles in Spain
Number-one singles in Zimbabwe
Robbie Williams songs
RPM Top Singles number-one singles
Song recordings produced by George Michael
Song recordings produced by Stephen Hague
Songs written by George Michael
Songs about freedom
LGBT-related songs